Ebenezer is an unincorporated community in Greene County, Missouri, United States.  It lies two miles north of McDaniel Lake north of Springfield and 1.25 miles east of Route 13. The community is at the head of the King Branch of the North Dry Sac River.

A post office called Ebenezer was established in 1866, and remained in operation until 1901. Ebenezer is a name of biblical origin, appearing in I Samuel 7:12.

References

Unincorporated communities in Greene County, Missouri
Springfield metropolitan area, Missouri
Unincorporated communities in Missouri